A horse show steward, sometimes also called a rules steward or licensed steward, is a licensed official at a horse show tasked with the responsibility of interpreting and enforcing the rules of the organization that sanctions the horse show.  In many organizations, stewards also must submit reports following the show explaining any major rules violations or other information that may be required.  The show steward is an individual required to be of the highest ethical standard.

Stewards must attend training both in a classroom setting and on the job, pass certain tests, and routinely attend additional educational program for licensure renewal.  Next to the judge, the show steward is the most important official at the show.

In the United States, most show stewards are licensed by the United States Equestrian Federation (USEF), though other breed and equestrian organizations that sanction shows also have their own programs for training and certifying their officials.  Other nations have similar programs, with titles that vary from organization to organization.

See also
International Federation for Equestrian Sports

References
United States Equestrian Federation, see http://www.equestrian.org for the USEF web site, access to online rule book

Horse showing and exhibition